The vehicle registration plates of the Central African Republic allows the identification of vehicles registered in the Central African Republic.

Regular plates

For private vehicles, it takes the form "LL CCC LL", where L are letters and C are numbers. The first group of two letters varies from DA to SZ and UB to VZ, followed by a group of three digits ranging from 001 to 999. The last two letters denote the prefecture of registration  On the left is the emblem of the Central African Economic and Monetary Community (CEMAC) and the RCA code.

Registration codes

The last two letters designated the prefecture of registration.

Coding by type of vehicle

 Ax, Bx - legal entities
 Dx - individuals
 TA - temporary license plates

Historical

Central African license plates have known different formats since the 1960s. The first plates were on a black background with silver characters. In the 80s, the plates pass on a blue background. Since September 1, 2006, the country has adopted CEMAC plates with black characters on a white background.

Other formats

Temporary plates

Temporary license plates have a red background with white symbols. The format of such signs TA123BV, where TA series is the index of temporality, 123 - number, and BV - the region code.

Diplomatic license plates

The license plates of diplomatic staff, following the French example, have a green background and orange or white symbols.

License plates of ambassadors 

License plates of diplomatic ambassadors have the format 123CMD456, where 123 is the country code, CMD is index of the head of the diplomatic mission, and 456 is the number.

License plates of other diplomats 

License plates of diplomatic personnel have the format 123СD456, where 123 is the country code, CD is the index of the diplomatic corps, 456 is the number.

Consular staff 

License plates of administrative and technical staff of diplomatic missions have the format 123K456, where 123 is the country code, K - consul, and 456 is the number.

References

External links
 License plates of the Central African Republic

Central African Republic